Estadio Uno was a Uruguayan television program. It aired from 1970 to 2017 on Televisión Nacional Uruguay (TNU) Channel 5.

History
Estadio Uno began as a football debate program, which dealt with sports, opinion, and cultural issues. Over time it came to cover basketball, cycling, athletics, the Olympic Games, and any sporting activity.

Its final team comprised Sánchez Padilla, Mario Bardanca, Axel Fucks, and Ariel Alsina.

The show featured exclusive interviews, documents, and all Uruguayan goals from 1978 to 1994 (the year in which their rights were sold). The program was also part of Monte Carlo TV, channel 4.

Julio Sánchez Padilla often used the phrase "the eight viewers of Estadio Uno", in reference to a report by a ratings agency, repeated by the newspaper El Día, saying that the program had 0.00001 of the total audience. That is to say that the Estadio Uno team was seen by eight people.

In 2013, TNU Channel 5 announced that Estadio Uno would be one of 14 projects to be continued in its new "associated production" mode.

In February 2016, Estadio Uno was broadcast from the Estadio Campeón del Siglo.

Awards and honors
Estadio Uno was the longest-running show on Uruguayan television, and on 14 January 2002, Julio Sánchez Padilla was recognized by Guinness World Records as the television director with the longest uninterrupted tenure.

The Uruguayan Post issued a stamp commemorating the program.

Presenters

Gallery

References

External links
 

1970 Uruguayan television series debuts
2017 disestablishments in Uruguay
2017 Uruguayan television series endings
Sports television series
Uruguayan television series
Canal 5 (Uruguay) original programming